The following is a list of notable events that are related to Philippine music in 2015.

Events

January
 January 8 – Diego Loyzaga, Tippy Dos Santos and Erica Abello were announced as the new MYX VJs.
 January 13 – Hale had their mini reunion concert less than 5 years after their break up. On January 27, they released their first single in more than 4 years entitled See You.
 January 25 – Kamikazee announced that after this year they will take a hiatus.

February
 February 19 – The nominees for the Myx Music Awards 2015 were announced through an online webcast.

March
 March 1 – Jason Dy of Team Sarah was declared as the grand winner of the second season of The Voice of the Philippines held at the Newport Performing Arts Theater, Resorts World Manila. He was coached by Sarah Geronimo.
 March 14 – The Philippine version of Your Face Sounds Familiar, a singing and impersonation competition wherein celebrities will impersonate other iconic singers premiered on ABS-CBN. It will be hosted by Billy Crawford while Jed Madela, Gary Valenciano and Sharon Cuneta will serve as judges.
 March 25
 Myx Music Awards 2015 at the Samsung Hall.
 Joey Generoso had officially left his band, Side A, in pursuit of a solo career.
 Jamie Rivera received an Award for Excellence for Musical Arts & Culture from the Youth Leadership Summit at the Carlos P. Romulo Auditorium.

April
 April 1 – Filipino rock band, Urbandub announced that they have decided to call it quits after 15 years in the industry during a radio show in Jam 88.3. Their farewell concert is scheduled on May 9, to coincide with the group's 15th anniversary.
 April 17 – The 12 finalists for the Philippine Popular Music Festival 2015 were announced.

June
 June 5 – The submission of entries for the Himig Handog P-Pop Love Songs 2016 officially opens. Deadline of submission is on July 31.
 June 6 – The Voice Kids returned to Philippine television on ABS-CBN for a second season. Sarah Geronimo, Bamboo Mañalac and Lea Salonga all returned as coaches while Luis Manzano returned as its main host with Robi Domingo and Yeng Constantino joining him as his new co-hosts, the latter replacing Alex Gonzaga.
 June 7 – Comedian Melai Cantiveros was named the first grand winner of Your Face Sounds Familiar at the Newport Performing Arts Theater at Resorts World Manila.
 June 19 – The interpreters for the Philpop 2015 were unveiled.

July
 July 1 – Sarah Geronimo with her song Kilometro represented the Philippines in the 10th International Song Contest:The Global Sound hosted by Australian jury, as one of the 70 international semi-finalists and later on advanced as one of the top 25 finalists. At the final round, she won the Gold Global Sound Award as the top recognition.
 July 22 – American singer Chris Brown was placed under the Philippine government's immigration lookout bulletin, hours before his solo concert at the SM Mall of Asia Arena. Brown was able to leave Manila on July 24 after he had filed a departure clearance due to a legal issue between him and the Iglesia ni Cristo that prevented him from leaving the Philippines.

August
 August 30 – Elha Nympha, coached by Bamboo Mañalac, won the second season of The Voice Kids held at the Newport Performing Arts Theater, Resorts World Manila.

September
 September 21 – Star Music, the music division of ABS-CBN Corporation's Star Creatives, acquired the copyrights to around 116 original compositions of Tito Sotto, Vic Sotto and Joey de Leon which includes songs popularized by 70's group VST & Co., Sharon Cuneta, and Nora Aunor, and popular songs such as "Ipagpatawad Mo," "Tayo'y Magsayawan" and "Awitin Mo, Isasayaw Ko."

Debuts

Soloist

 Alex Gonzaga
 Edward Benosa
 Julian Trono
 Rita De Guzman
 Yassi Pressman
 Vanessa Quillao
 Jacob Benedicto
 Maris Racal
 Marlo Mortel
 Alexander Diaz
 Iñigo Pascual
 DJ Moophs
 Alexandra
 Reneé Pionso
 Kay Cal
 JC Padilla
 Hazel Faith dela Cruz
 Aleph
 Muffet
 Yexel Sebastian
 Michelle Ortega
 Migz Haleco
 Pauline Cueto
 Nitoy Mallillin
 Matteo Guidicelli
 Reese Lansangan

Bands/Groups

 Reo Brothers
 Harana
 Rouge Band
 MMJ
 SUD

Reunion
 Hale
 Idolito dela Cruz

Disbandment
 Urbandub
 Kamikazee (band)

Albums released
The following albums are released in 2015 locally. Note: All soundtracks are not included in this list.

Concerts and music festivals

Cancelled events

Awarding ceremonies
 March 25: Myx Music Awards 2015, organized by myx
 July 11: 2nd MOR Pinoy Music Awards, organized by MOR 101.9
 November 10: 7th Star Awards for Music, organized by the Philippine Movie Press Club (PMPC)
 December 10: 28th Aliw Awards for Live Entertainment

Deaths
 April 1 – Roel Cortez, Filipino singer-songwriter (born 1967)
 April 17 – Gary Ignacio, Filipino singer-songwriter, lead vocalist of the band Alamid (born 1966)
 July 24 – Jimboy Salazar, Filipino singer (born 1973)
 August 2 – Marcelo Ong, member of the Masculados Dos (born 1985)
 October 8 – Elizabeth Ramsey, comedian, singer and actress (born 1931)
 November 2 – Nolyn Cabahug, classical singer (born 1956)
 December 17 – Emil Sanglay, vocalist of folk-rock band Penpen

References

 
Philippines
Music
Philippine music industry